The 2001 Mississippi flag referendum was a legislatively referred state statute appearing on an April 17, 2001 special election ballot, an election held specifically for this referendum.

Voters were asked to choose between two propositions relating to the Flag of Mississippi. Proposition A would keep the then current flag, which featured the Confederate battle flag in the canton. Proposition B would have slightly altered the flag by replacing the rebel battle flag canton with another completely brand new and different canton of a blue square featuring 20 white stars, arranged in a circle row, representing Mississippi as the 20th state in the union. Voters chose proposition A, which maintained the then current flag until its replacement in 2021.

Proposition A

Arguments 
 "The pro-Proposition B economic argument didn't work because they could never name a single business that left the state of Mississippi or didn't come here because of the flag. And the racism argument didn't work because all these white liberals were lumping all black people together as helpless victims, and that didn't go over too well with anyone."

Supporters 
 Sons of Confederate Veterans
 United Daughters of the Confederacy

Proposition B

Arguments 
 Pro-Proposition B forces issued an advertisement reading, “It's not right that our kids can't find good jobs close to home because companies won't locate in our state, but it's a fact. They have the wrong idea about Mississippi. A state flag that includes the Confederate flag just adds to those false opinions.”

Supporters 
 Governor Ronnie Musgrove
 Former Governor William Winter
 Morgan Freeman
 Mississippi Economic Council
 Mississippi National Association for the Advancement of Colored People (NAACP)

Result 
Voters voted to maintain the current flag, keeping the following law:§ 3-3-16. Design of state flag. The official flag of the State of Mississippi shall have the following design: with width two-thirds (2/3) of its length; with the union (canton) to be square, in width two-thirds (2/3) of the width of the flag; the ground of the union to be red and a broad blue saltire thereon, bordered with white and emblazoned with thirteen (13) mullets or five-pointed stars, corresponding with the number of the original States of the Union; the field to be divided into three (3) bars of equal width, the upper one blue, the center one white, and the lower one, extending the whole length of the flag, red (the national colors); this being the flag adopted by the Mississippi Legislature in the 1894 Special Session.

Results by county

See also 
 2020 Mississippi flag referendum
 Removal of Confederate monuments and memorials

References 

Flag controversies in the United States
April 2001 events in the United States
Flag referendums
2001 Mississippi elections
2001 ballot measures
Mississippi ballot measures